Philipp Oswald and Filip Polášek were the defending champions, but chose to participate with different partners. Oswald partnered Marcus Daniell and lost in the quarterfinals to Marcel Granollers and Horacio Zeballos. Polášek partnered Ivan Dodig and lost in the semifinals to Austin Krajicek and Franko Škugor.

Krajicek and Škugor went on to win the title, defeating Granollers and Zeballos in the final, 7–6(7–5), 7–5.

Seeds

Draw

Draw

References
Main Draw

Generali Open Kitzbühel - Doubles
2020 Doubles